William John James (born 22 August 1969) is a South African born, Swaziland international lawn bowler.

Bowls career
James made his international debut in 1998 and has represented Swaziland at two Commonwealth Games; in the singles event at the 2002 Commonwealth Games and in the singles event at the 2006 Commonwealth Games.

He won a silver medal at the 2007 World Singles Champion of Champions in Warilla, Australia.

Personal life
He is a farmer by trade and lives in Malkerns.

References

External links
 
 

1969 births
Living people
Swazi bowls players
Commonwealth Games competitors for Eswatini
Bowls players at the 2002 Commonwealth Games
Bowls players at the 2006 Commonwealth Games